Partners is a 1993 copper statue by Blaine Gibson depicting Walt Disney holding the hand of the most popular character he created, Mickey Mouse. It is the central point of attention as guests enter some of the Disney parks. Gibson took a year to create the piece. He used a 1960 bust of Disney as his model for Disney's half. To sculpt Disney and Mickey's joined hands, he consulted the 1940 film Fantasia, where Mickey shook hands with conductor Leopold Stokowski.

There has been speculation regarding Disney's stance in the sculpture. Many believed his outstretched hand indicated he was showing Mickey what had come of his (Disney's) dream. Gibson said, “I chose to depict Walt as he was in 1954. I think that was when [he] was in his prime. It was tough trying to match the media image of Walt Disney, the one the public knows, to the real Walt, the one we knew. I think Walt is admiring the park and saying to Mickey, ‘Look what we’ve accomplished together,’ because truly they were very much a team through it all. ‘Look at all the happy people who have come to visit us today.’”

As revealed in "A Virtual Tour of Walt Disney Imagineering: Part 2", Mickey was initially going to be portrayed holding an ice cream cone, but it was decided it would make him appear too juvenile.

The plaque beneath the statues bear slightly different versions of words that Disney never actually uttered. His closest actual words to the inscriptions were, "I think what I want most of all is for Disneyland to be a happy place." Parts of sentences from an unrelated interview were added to this.

Sculptor 

Blaine Gibson (February 11, 1918 – July 5, 2015) was born on a small farm in Rocky Ford, Colorado. After graduating high school, he attended Colorado University. When he was 21, he applied for a position at Walt Disney Studios. He applied through the mail, requesting information regarding any job opportunities there. He received a reply explaining that he could apply by mail, and should include a drawing with his application. His illustration of a little boy milking a cow and squirting the milk into a kitten's mouth, won him a job as an effects animator for the studios in 1939. Later, as a Disney Imagineer, drawing was his focus for many years.

Gibson is most known for his animations in Fantasia, Bambi, Song of the South, Alice in Wonderland, Peter Pan, Sleeping Beauty, and One Hundred and One Dalmatians. After ten years, he became an assistant animator to Frank Thomas. While Gibson was very successful in animation, sculpting had always been his passion. He designed and animated at work, and took classes at Pasadena City College to perfect his sculpting techniques. Disney soon took interest in his sculptures, and assigned him to the Disneyland Project. From there, he sculpted full-time for the park's attractions. Some of his most noticeable works are the pirates in Pirates of the Caribbean, the ghosts and ghouls of the Haunted Mansion, the birds in the Enchanted Tiki Room, and the children of It's a Small World. He also sculpted busts of the presidents for the Hall of Presidents. After his retirement in 1983, he was consulted on the bust of Barack Obama.

Gibson died of heart failure on July 5, 2015 at the age of 97.

Locations 

The original statue is in front of Sleeping Beauty Castle in Disneyland. It was unveiled there in 1993 on Mickey Mouse’s birthday, November 18. The plaque below it in Disneyland quotes Walt Disney as saying, "I think most of all what I want Disneyland to be is a happy place...where parents and children can have fun...together." 

It was recreated for Walt Disney World's Magic Kingdom and placed there on June 19, 1995. Its plaque has a slightly different quote: "We believe in our idea: a family park where parents and children could have fun — together."

There are now five versions of the Partners statue. The third  was placed in the Tokyo Disney Resort in Tokyo Disneyland on April 15, 1998. The fourth was installed in Walt Disney Studios in Burbank, California on December 5, 2001. The fifth was added to Walt Disney Studios Park at Disneyland Paris on March 16, 2002.

An award, Partners In Excellence, is awarded to less than 2% of cast members who work at Disney Parks around the world . It demonstrates characteristics of an excellent worker, who has the company in mind through all of their actions. Should someone be awarded this, they receive a pin of the statue to put on their name tag. In 1981, to honor the 200-millionth guest to enter the gates of Disneyland, Charles Boyer was instructed to create a lithograph of Mickey Mouse and Walt Disney holding hands. Only 2,500 were made to sell to cast members only. This image became very popular and is the basis for Partners. (Partners looks very different compared to the lithograph due to artistic differences). The letters “STR” on Walt’s tie represent Smoke Tree Ranch, a resort in Palm Springs where Disney owned a home.

References 

Statues in California
Cultural depictions of Walt Disney
Bronze sculptures in California
Bronze sculptures in Florida
Bronze sculptures in France
Bronze sculptures in Japan
1993 sculptures
Disneyland
Magic Kingdom
Tokyo Disneyland
Walt Disney Studios Park
Sculptures of men in California
Statues of fictional characters
Mickey Mouse in art